Stroumpi or Stroumbi ( Stroumpí) is a small village in central Paphos District, Cyprus, and halfway between Paphos and Polis. The name of the village is said to derive from its founder, a man called "Stroumpos", or the shape of the surrounding hills (stroumpoula, meaning "rounded"). The village is known for its annual "Dionysia" wine festival named after Dionysos, the ancient Greek god of wine, that takes place next to central square where the Ayias Sophias 
church is located at the end of August. A now-defunct "Dionysos" volleyball team was based in Stroumpi and played in the Cypriot top league.

A 6.0 earthquake in 1953 destroyed the original settlement at Stroumpi, killing many. The village was rebuilt at a nearby location shortly after. The village is located in an altitude of 453 m. It receives about 665 millimetres of rainfall annually.

Stroumbi is located about 15 kilometres north-east of Pafos.

The village is built at an average altitude of 450 metres and receives an average annual rainfall of about 665 millimetres. Vines of mostly wine-making varieties, fruit-trees, almond, olive, and walnut trees are cultivated in its region.

Distances
Regarding transportation, the village stands at about the middle of the route from Pafos (17 km) to Polis Chrysochous (20 km).

References

External links
Stroumpi community council

Communities in Paphos District